Rajshahi Medical University  is a public medical university in Rajshahi, Bangladesh. The organization is conducting the university's work in the Rajshahi Medical College by recruiting manpower.

History
The administrative and academic activities of Rajshahi Medical University were officially started in the temporary office in 2017. Rajshahi Medical University was established with the objective of rapid implementation of education and medical activities and all government and private medical colleges, dental colleges, nursing colleges or institutes of Rajshahi, Rangpur  divisions under the supervision of Medical University and proper supervision.

List of vice-chancellors 
 AZM Mostaque Hossain (Tuhin)  (May 30, 2021 – present )

Background
Rajshahi Medical University, established in Rajshahi, Rangpur division to supervise whether these 40 public and private medical institutions will be functioning properly. In this, Rajshahi Medical University will be responsible for the medical and dental colleges, nursing colleges, institute of health technology (IHT), medical education institutes.

Faculties
Higher degree of medical treatment in 85 disciplines under 9 faculty of Rajshahi Medical University.

References 

Education in Rajshahi
Educational institutions established in 2017
2017 establishments in Bangladesh
Public Medical University of Bangladesh
Medical universities in Bangladesh